Peterson Ridge is a high rock ridge that extends north from the west part of Storm Peak massif, in Queen Alexandra Range. Named by the Ohio State University Geological Expedition, 1969–70, for Donald N. Peterson, party member who collected basalt lavas from the ridge for petrologic and paleomagnetic studies.

Ridges of the Ross Dependency
Shackleton Coast